Robert Elliot may refer to:
Rob Elliot (born 1986), English-born Irish footballer
Robert Henry Elliot (1837–1914), Scottish writer
Robert Elliot (Royal Navy officer), English naval officer and topographical draughtsman
Robert Elliot (surgeon) (1864–1936), British ophthalmic surgeon and author

See also
Robert Elliott (disambiguation)